Michael Wojas (9 August 1956 – 6 June 2010) was an English nightclub owner who ran The Colony Room Club in Dean Street in London's Soho district, from 1994 until he closed it in 2007, having inherited it from Ian Board who took it over from Muriel Belcher, who founded the private drinking club in 1948.

Early life
Wojas was born in London on 9 August 1956. He was educated at Haberdashers' Aske's Boys' School, Hertfordshire, and graduated in 1981 from the University of Nottingham with a degree in chemistry.

The Colony
Wojas worked at The Colony Room Club as a barman and "Board's sidekick" for 13 years, and was bequeathed the club by Board at his 1994 death. He attracted a new generation of artists to the Colony including Young British Artists such as Damien Hirst, Tracey Emin and Sarah Lucas, singer Lisa Stansfield and fashion designer Pam Hogg.

In 1997, the film-maker John Maybury directed Love Is the Devil: Study for a Portrait of Francis Bacon a biopic of the life of Colony regular Francis Bacon, starring Derek Jacobi as Bacon, with Colony sequences shot in the club itself. However, the club was too small, so an exact replica was created in a film studio, with Wojas as an extra. Wojas brought numerous old-time members to appear as extras too, and when Jacobi appeared, several inebriated habituees thought he was Bacon, and Wojas had to convince them, "It isn't Francis because Francis is dead, and this isn't the Colony Room".

In 2007, the Colony's lease expired, and in deteriorating health, Wojas closed it, and auctioned the artwork including a large painting by Michael Andrews. The closure and auction led to a bitter legal battle with several of the regular members. Wojas was diagnosed with cancer soon after, and in his last year gave up smoking and drinking.

Death
Wojas' humanist funeral took place at Kensal Green Crematorium on 16 June 2010, accompanied by the band Alabama 3 and more than 300 mourners, and his home-made cardboard coffin turned out to be too wide to pass through the portal. He was survived by his mother.

References

1956 births
2010 deaths
Bartenders
Nightclub managers
People educated at Haberdashers' Boys' School
Alumni of the University of Nottingham